Alicia Porro Freire de Maciel (17 May 1908  Montevideo – 24 November 1983), was a Uruguayan musician and poet who used the pseudonym Tacón de Fierro, for her musical compositions, and Margarita Irigoyen to sign her prints, some of which illustrated her book covers.

Life 
She was born in Montevideo, Uruguay, on 17 May 1908. Her parents were Francisco F. Porro and Fermina Freire.

In 1938, she graduated from the School of Medicine of the University of the Republic as an obstetrician, and then practiced in her private practice and in the Cooperative. In 1945 she obtained the title of librarian and, later on, she founded the Children's Library No. 1 of the Council of Primary Education, an institution in which she was also in charge of the project on school journalism, from 1937 to 1956.

Always linked to Education, she was involved in several programs and projects for Uruguayan children. In 1941, she founded the magazine Compañeros, a school newspaper with a print run of 24,000 copies, and a children's club with the same name, where she gave workshops in Esperanto. She also led the Legion del Soldadito Verde, an initiative to spread the benefits of vaccines, the dangers of smoking and drinking alcoholic beverages, supported by national public institutions.

She has published her written, musical and graphic work, and also participated in radio and television programs. At the end of 1928, a radio broadcast began on CX26, with the name of Señorita Lily, Porro being one of the first female voices in Uruguay and in Montevideo to take charge of one hour program. This resulted in several participations in radio, CX 8, CX12, CX 18, CX 32, Cx38 Sodre. On television she appeared on Channel 4, on the programs "Educational Television" and "Union of Mothers". She was literary correspondent of the magazines Orientación (Buenos Aires), Savia (Ecuador), Hostos (Puerto Rico), and Páginas Selectas (Quito).

She was considered one of the young poets of "the new generation" of Americanism, from the 20s. She was compared with Delmira Agustini and Juana de Ibarbourou.

Works 
 Savia Nueva, poemas, 1925. 
 Polen, poemas, 1928. 
 Eva, cuentos y novelas breves, 1928. 
 Periodismo Escolar en el Uruguay, 1946. 
 Mario, poemas 1969.
 La puerta entreabierta, poemas, 1978.

References

External links 

Uruguayan librarians
Women librarians
University of the Republic (Uruguay) alumni
Uruguayan women poets
1983 deaths
Uruguayan radio presenters
Uruguayan women radio presenters
Writers from Montevideo
Musicians from Montevideo
1908 births
Uruguayan obstetricians
20th-century Uruguayan poets
20th-century Uruguayan women writers
Uruguayan women physicians